The 1986 Western Michigan Broncos football team represented Western Michigan University in the Mid-American Conference (MAC) during the 1986 NCAA Division I-A football season.  In their fifth and final season under head coach Jack Harbaugh, the Broncos compiled a 3–8 record (3–5 against MAC opponents), finished in eighth place in the MAC, and were outscored by their opponents, 257 to 183.  The team played its home games at Waldo Stadium in Kalamazoo, Michigan.

The team's statistical leaders included Chris Conklin with 1,668 passing yards, Joe Glenn with 602 rushing yards, and Kelly Spielmaker with 575 receiving yards. Quarterback Chris Conklin, guard Sam Culbert, and defensive tackle Mark Garalczyk were the team captains. Garalczyk received the team's most outstanding player award; he was also selected as the MAC defensive player of the year.

On November 17, 1986, two days after the final game of the season, and despite winning three of the last five games, coach Harbaugh was fired. Harbaugh had compiled a record of 25–27–3. Michigan coach Bo Schembechler called Harbaugh's firing "one of the tragedies of sport", referred to the head coaching job at Western as "the worst job in America", and said that Western had "the worst-administered athletic department, maybe the worst-administered school."

Schedule

References

Western Michigan
Western Michigan Broncos football seasons
Western Michigan Broncos football